Flood is the third album by Japanese experimental band Boris, released on December 15, 2000. It consists of a single 70-minute title-track that is broken into four movements.

While Flood did not receive many reviews upon release, it has become a cult classic among fans, prompting the band to play it in its entirety every night of their 2013 US-based "Residency Tour".

Musical style 
The album marked a change in musical direction; it features less of the abrasive sound heard on Absolutego and Amplifier Worship, and incorporated minimalism and progressive rock elements.

Track listing

Credits

Line-up
 Atsuo – drums, percussion, gong, vocals
 Takeshi – vocals, bass, guitar, words
 Wata – guitar, effects

Additional personnel
 Boris – producer
 Hiroshi Okura – executive producer
 Tetsuya "Cherry" Tochigi – engineer
 Hiroyasu Tahira – engineer assistant
 Miyuki Kobayashi – engineer assistant
 Masashi Tsukahara – album coordination
 Toshiaki Shimizu – A&R
 Fangs Anal Satan – artwork
 Eri Shabata – photography
 Shuji Kitamura – mastering

Pressing information

References

External links
 Inoxia Records
 Boris Homepage
 

2000 albums
Boris (band) albums
Drone metal albums
Post-rock albums